Sideroxylon peninsulare is a species of plant in the family Sapotaceae. It is endemic to two spots on the southern end of the Mexican state of Baja California Sur.

References

peninsulare
Endemic flora of Mexico
Trees of Baja California Sur
Vulnerable plants
Taxonomy articles created by Polbot